The 2013 Kazakhstan Premier League was the 22nd season of the Kazakhstan Premier League, the highest football league competition in Kazakhstan. The season began on 9 March 2013 and ended on 2 November. Shakhter Karagandy were the defending champions, having won their second league championship the previous year.

Changes from 2012 season
The league was reduced from fourteen to twelve teams for this season.

Teams
For the 2013 season, the league changed from 14 teams to 12, meaning the bottom two teams from the previous season, Sunkar and Okzhetpes, along with Kaisar were relegated to the Kazakhstan First Division with only Vostok, the second place team, gaining promotion.

Team overview

Personnel and kits

Note: Flags indicate national team as has been defined under FIFA eligibility rules. Players and Managers may hold more than one non-FIFA nationality.

Managerial changes

Foreign players
The number of foreign players is restricted to eight per KPL team. A team can use only five foreign players on the field in each game.

In bold: Players that have been capped for their national team.

First round

League table

Results

Championship round

Table

Results

Relegation round

Table

Results

Relegation play-off

Top goalscorers

References

Kazakhstan Premier League seasons
1
Kazakh
Kazakh